Momik (died 1333) was an Armenian architect, sculptor and a master artist of Armenian illuminated manuscripts. As a sculptor, Momik is also known for his fine carving of khachkars, found primarily at the monastery complex at Noravank. He held an eminent position at the Gladzor School of Illuminated Manuscripts in Syunik, established at Vayots Dzor under the patronage of the Orbelian family's historian, Stepanos Orbelian. Of the manuscripts authored by Momik, only several survive: one is found at the repository of the Mekhitarist Order in Vienna and three others are found at the Mashtots Institute of Ancient Manuscripts in Yerevan, Armenia.

Following Stepanos Orbelian's death in 1305, Momik began carving a khachkar in honor of the great historian, completing in 1306.

Momik was the author of the miniatures for the Gospel, "Entombment" and "Angel Appearing to Holy Women", created in Glazdor in 1302, of the building of Astvatsatsin church in Areni village (1321), of its wonderful reliefs and of a number of khachkars. He also designed and carved the masterpiece church of S. Astvatsatsin at Noravank Monastery in Armenia.

References

1333 deaths
Armenian architects
Medieval Armenian painters
Armenian sculptors
Manuscript illuminators
Year of birth unknown